Ataxia haitiensis is a species of beetle in the family Cerambycidae. It was described by Warren Samuel Fisher in 1932. It is known from Haiti.

References

Ataxia (beetle)
Beetles described in 1932